Michel Vastel (20 May 1940 – 28 August 2008) was a Quebec journalist and columnist for Le Journal de Montréal and other medias. He was born in Saint-Pierre-de-Cormeilles, Eure, France and immigrated to Canada in 1970.

Vastel began his career in the Nord-Pas de Calais region.  He subsequently moved to Montreal, Quebec, Canada.  He first worked at the Government of Quebec and the Quebec Employers Council, then began to write for Le Devoir, La Presse, Quebec City's Le Soleil and Ottawa-Gatineau's Le Droit.

He was also contributor for L'actualité, CKAC and the Société Radio-Canada. He died in Bedford, Quebec on August 28, 2008 from throat cancer.

Bibliography
 Le Neveu (1987, about mafia hitman Réal Simard)
 Trudeau le Québécois (1989, about Prime Minister Pierre Trudeau)
 Bourassa (1991, about Premier Robert Bourassa)
 Lucien Bouchard, en attendant la suite… (1995, about Premier Lucien Bouchard)
 Landry, le grand dérangeant (2001, about Premier Bernard Landry)
 Chrétien, Un Canadien pure laine, 2003
 Nathalie: Briser le silence (2005, about singer and abuse victim Nathalie Simard)

See also 
 Politics of Quebec

References
Notes

Sources
Alan Hustak, "Vastel remembered as good, but often abrasive journalist", The Gazette

External links 
Article archive (1996 to 2004) at Vigile.net
Blog of Michel Vastel at the L'actualité website

1940 births
2008 deaths
People from Eure
Deaths from esophageal cancer
French emigrants to Canada
French emigrants to Quebec
Journalists from Quebec
Writers from Quebec
Canadian non-fiction writers in French
Deaths from cancer in Quebec